José Cobos Benítez (born 2 January 1963 in Málaga) is a wheelchair basketball athlete from Spain.  He has a physical disability: he is a 3-point wheelchair basketball player. He played wheelchair basketball at the 1996 Summer Paralympics. His team was fourth.

References

External links 
 
 

1963 births
Living people
Spanish men's wheelchair basketball players
Paralympic wheelchair basketball players of Spain
Wheelchair basketball players at the 1996 Summer Paralympics
Wheelchair category Paralympic competitors
Sportspeople from Málaga
20th-century Spanish people